Mahn Win Maung (17 April 1916 – 4 July 1989) was a statesman who served as the third president of Burma.

Early life 
Win Maung was an ethnic Karen and born on 17 April 1916 in the Irrawaddy delta, son of Daw Tharya and U Shwe Yin. He graduated with a B.A. from Rangoon University's Judson College in 1937.

Career 
Between 1947 and 1956 he was variously Minister of Ministry of Mining and Labour, Minister of the Ministry of Transport and Telecommunication and Minister of the Ministry of Water, Air and Coastal Ship.

He was selected by Prime Minister U Nu for the presidency in March 1957. He served for five years until 2 March 1962, when General Ne Win's military coup d'état ousted Nu's government. He was imprisoned between 1962 and 1967.

Personal life 
He privately visited the United States to receive medical treatment from 16 to 28 December 1957. During his visit to the U.S., he met with President Dwight D. Eisenhower, 34th President of the United States.

References

 New York Times Obituary: Mahn Win Maung, Ex-Burmese President, 73

External links

 Leaders of Myanmar (Burma)

1989 deaths
Presidents of Myanmar
1916 births
Anti-Fascist People's Freedom League politicians
Burmese people of Karen descent
People from Ayeyarwady Region
University of Yangon alumni